The Antares A-10 Solo is a Ukrainian ultralight trike designed and produced by Antares Aircraft. The aircraft is supplied as a kit for amateur construction or complete and ready-to-fly.

Design and development
The A-10 Solo is a single-seat derivative of the two-seat Antares MA-32. The A-10 is distributed as a kit in the United States where it is approved for the [[amateur-built aircraft|Experimental - Amateur-built]]'' category.

The aircraft design features a cable-braced hang glider-style high-wing, weight-shift controls, a single-seat open cockpit with a cockpit fairing, tricycle landing gear with wheel pants and a single engine in pusher configuration.

The aircraft is made from bolted-together aluminum tubing, with a single-piece composite mainwheel spring system and a titanium front wheel fork for off-airport landings. The double surface wing covered in Dacron sailcloth. Its  span wing is supported by a single tube-type kingpost and uses an "A" frame weight-shift control bar. Optionally a "topless" wing, lacking the kingpost, can be fitted. The powerplant is a twin cylinder, air-cooled, two-stroke, dual-ignition  Rotax 503 engine or optionally a  Rotax 447 engine. 

A number of different wings can be fitted to the basic carriage, including the standard Aeros Stranger 2, or Aeros Still 17. Optional wings include the Aeros Stranger 2M, Aeros Stream 16 or Aeros Profi

Specifications (A-10 Solo)

References

External links

A-10
1990s Ukrainian sport aircraft
1990s Ukrainian ultralight aircraft
Homebuilt aircraft
Single-engined pusher aircraft
Ultralight trikes